Deudorix hypargyria, the scarce cornelian, is a species of butterfly belonging to the lycaenid family described by Henry John Elwes in 1893. It is found in the Indomalayan realm (Burma to Sundaland and the Philippines).

Subspecies
Deudorix hypargyria hypargyria (Burma to Sundaland)
Deudorix hypargyria annawarneckae Schröder & Treadaway, 2013 (Philippines)

References

External links
Deudorix at Markku Savela's Lepidoptera and Some Other Life Forms

Deudorix
Butterflies described in 1893